Baywood-Los Osos (locally known as Los Osos-Baywood Park) is an unincorporated community in western San Luis Obispo County, California. The population was 14,351 in the 2000 census. It includes the communities of Los Osos, which is located near Morro Bay, Baywood Park, and the former community of Cuesta-by-the-Sea.

Geography and natural history

Baywood-Los Osos is located at  (35.316795, -120.835605).

This locale was settled originally by Chumash peoples who developed habitation sites and exploited marine resources for food.

Demographics

Baywood-Los Osos was a census-designated place (CDP) through the 2000 census, but the CDP was abolished before the 2010 census. As of the census of 2000, there were 14,351 persons, 5,892 households, and 3,876 families residing in the CDP. The racial makeup of the CDP was 88.27% White, 0.64% African American, 0.69% Native American, 4.56% Asian, 0.07% Pacific Islander, 2.49% from other races, and 3.28% from two or more races. Hispanic or Latino of any race were 9.00% of the population.

There were 5,892 households, out of which 27.9% had children under the age of 18 living with them, 52.9% were married couples living together, 9.6% had a female householder with no husband present, and 34.2% were non-families. 25.6% of all households were made up of individuals, and 12.2% had someone living alone who was 65 years of age or older. The average household size was 2.42 and the average family size was 2.91.

In the CDP, the population was spread out, with 21.6% under the age of 18, 7.6% from 18 to 24, 24.7% from 25 to 44, 27.1% from 45 to 64, and 19.0% who were 65 years of age or older. The median age was 43 years. For every 100 females, there were 92.3 males. For every 100 females age 18 and over, there were 88.2 males.

The median income for a household in the CDP was $46,558, and the median income for a family was $55,838. Males had a median income of $39,311 versus $31,450 for females. The per capita income for the CDP was $24,838. About 5.0% of families and 8.5% of the population were below the poverty line, including 8.4% of those under age 18 and 5.1% of those age 65 or over.

Politics

See also
 Elfin Forest Natural Area
 Los Osos Oaks State Natural Reserve
 Los Osos, California
 Amphibious Training Base Morro Bay used Baywood-Los Osos during World War 2

References
 C. Michael Hogan. 2008. Los Osos Back Bay, Megalithic Portal, editor A. Burnham
 San Luis Obispo County, California Planning Department. 1969. Preliminary Master Plan for the Baywood-Los Osos Area

Line notes

External links
 Los Osos / Baywood Park — Visitor Information

Unincorporated communities in San Luis Obispo County, California
Morro Bay
Former census-designated places in California
Populated coastal places in California
Unincorporated communities in California